Periclimenaeus ascidiarum is a species of shrimp of the family Palaemonidae. Periclimenaeus ascidiarum is found off the coasts of Florida, Colombia, Mexico, and elsewhere.

References

Crustaceans described in 1951
Fauna of Colombia
Fauna of Mexico
Taxa named by Lipke Holthuis
Palaemonidae